Sisowath Kossamak (9 April 1904 – 27 April 1975) was Queen of Cambodia as the wife of King Norodom Suramarit from 1955 to 1960. After her husband's death in 1960, her son Norodom Sihanouk became chief of state, while Kossamak played an important public representational rule during her son's reign in 1960-1970. Sisowath Kossamak was born a Cambodian princess as the daughter of King Sisowath Monivong and his wife Norodom Kanviman Norleak Tevi. Her official title was Preah Mohaksatreiyani Sisowath Monivong Kossamak Nearirath Serey Vathana. 

Upon the death of Monivong in 1941, Sihanouk took the throne. In 1955, he abdicated in favor of his father Suramarit, who then reigned for five years. After her husband's death, Kossamak kept her title of Queen and continued to function as the symbol and representative of the monarchy while Sihanouk assumed his position as monarch, but titled as Prince rather than King. Contrary to what has sometimes been alleged, she was never a monarch, as female succession was forbidden in the constitution. After the coup in March 1970, Kossamak was placed under arrest, but retained her title before being stripped of all status during the formal proclamation of the republic in October the same year. She remained under house arrest until her health declined in 1973, and she was allowed to join her son in China. Kossamak died in Beijing on 27 April 1975, ten days after the Khmer Rouge captured Phnom Penh.

Biography

Early life
Sisowath Kosamak was the daughter of King Sisowath Monivong and Queen Norodom Kanviman Norleak Thevi. 

She married her  prince Norodom Suramarit in 1920.

Upon the death of her father Monivong in 1941, Sihanouk, her son and Monivong's grandson, was selected as the new king. 

In the 1940s, Kossamak famously choreographed the apsara dance by training her first grand daughter, Princess Norodom Bopha Devi, to become the first Apsara dancer.

1955-1960

In 1955, Sihanouk abdicated in favour of his father, making Kossamak queen consort. In 1955, Shihanouk married Princess Monique. She was not on good terms with her daughter-in-law, Princess Monique, which led to advisories blaming Monique for the sometimes strained relationship between Kossamak and Sihanouk, and for Sihanouk's alleged initial hesitance to abdicate, as it would make his mother queen. Like her daughter-in-law, she was accused of promoting proteges to civil offices.  

Queen Kossamak enjoyed great respect and popularity: despite being neither a monarch nor politically influential, she was said to exert great moral authority over the Khmers, was described as generous to the poor and devoting herself to the welfare of the nation. As queen, she received foreign guests and hosted state functions, where the Royal Ballet of Cambodia often performed. A notable state visit was that of Chen Yi in November 1958, who led a women’s delegation from the People’s Republic of China.

1960-1970

Her son Prince Sihanouk had sworn in 1955 that he would never again ascend the throne, and he had also forbidden his own children from assuming sovereignty during his lifetime. When king Norodom Suramarit died in 1960, a demonstration took place in Battambang in which the protestors called for the widowed Queen Kossamak to take the throne as a ruling monarch. 

However, Article 25 of the Constitution prohibited her succeeding to the throne because of the stipulation that ‘the Throne of Cambodia is the heritage of the male descendants of King Ang Duong’. Her brother Prince Monireth was in favour of changing the Constitution, to allow his sister to be instated as sovereign in her own right. Considering the monarchy in a dubious situation, when Sihanouk was not willing to ascend the throne again not to allow his children to do so, the Council of Regency did propose to him that the constitution be changed so that his mother could succeed to the throne. However, Prince Sihanouk refused to agree to the suggestion because of his uneasy relationship with his mother and his unwillingness to allow anyone but himself as head of state. He commented his refusal with the comment that ‘Only God understands the reasons why I do not want my mother to ascend the throne.’ Among the Khmer Republic literati, Sihanouk’s refusal to allow his mother to succeed in 1960 was blamed his being ‘blinded by his passion for his wife Monique’, who were known for not getting along with her mother-in-law. 

Instead, Norodom Sihanouk himself again ascended the throne and succeed his father as head of state, although he did abstain from regaining the title of king. Once again head of state and monarch from 20 June 1960, he reorganised the royal palace and royal court were his mother lived. Contrary to what is sometimes alleged, Queen Sisowath Kossamak thus did not succeed her late spouse, and never ascended to the throne as ruling monarch. Her brother Prince Monireth commented the matter in his memoirs that it was a shame that his sister had not been born male so she could have succeeded to the throne: 
‘What a King we would have in Her! Certainly with Her, a great many disagreements, and a great deal of foolishness could have been avoided’. 
Despite never being a Queen and monarch in her own right, however, Sisowath Kossamak kept her title of Queen after the death of her spouse, which was a higher title than her son, the actual monarch, who insisted on keeping his title Prince rather than King. 

Queen Kossamak continued in her public representational role during the reign of her son as Prince-monarch during the 1960s. She also upheld her great popularity. Her prestigious public role was described in the New Cambodge 5 (September 1970): 
"Today, Her Majesty Queen Kossamak who neither reigns nor governs, exercises considerable moral authority over all Khmers and sits well in the line of past queens, compassionate towards the poor and busies herself in fulfilling her duties with regard to the Nation and the people".

The growing opposition gainst the Shihanouk-regime, however, did influence the perception of the queen mother as well. It has been suggested that Queen Kossamak did exercise the prerogative in influencing appointments to civil service positions and investment in non-transparent enterprises, which were normal for the Cambodian elite at the time. In 1968, there were slander among the opposition against both her and her daughter-in-law princess Monique for greed, for enriching themselves and for managing a brothel.

Later life

After the Cambodian coup of 1970, Kossamak was forced to leave the royal palace by the new government and held in house arrest in one wing of Khemarin Palace to prevent her from becoming involved in any potential royalist uprising. She was however asked by the Khmer Republic government to mediate between her son and the National Assembly ‘in a last-ditch attempt to turn the people’s anger and save her son’.

She was allowed to join her son in Beijing in China for health reasons in 1973. 

She died in Beijing in China 27 April 1975, shortly before her son and daughter-in-law returned to Cambodia.

Honours

Foreign honours
:
  First Class of the Order of the White Lion (1963)
:
 Adipurna First Class Star of the Republic of Indonesia (1968)
 Ethiopia:
 Knight of the Order of Solomon (1968)
:
 Grand Cross of the Legion of Honour 
 Laos:
 Grand Cross of the Order of the Million Elephants and the White Parasol (1963)
:
 Honorary Recipient of the Most Exalted Order of the Crown of the Realm (1964)
:
 First Class of the Order of Temasek (1963)
:
 Grand Star of the Order of the Yugoslav Star (1964)

References

 
 

|-

1904 births
1975 deaths
Cambodian Buddhists
Cambodian princesses
Cambodian queens
House of Sisowath
House of Norodom
Queen mothers
Daughters of kings
Recipients of orders, decorations, and medals of Ethiopia